Poésie meaning poem in French or plural Poésies (poems) may refer to:

 Poésies (Rimbaud), poems written by Arthur Rimbaud between 1869 and 1873
 Poésies (Mallarmé collection), an 1887 poetry collection by Stéphane Mallarmé

See also
Poésie Noire, Belgian band that rose to prominence in the mid-1980s
Poesy (disambiguation)